Trichosaundersia is a genus of parasitic flies in the family Tachinidae. There are about six described species in Trichosaundersia.

Species
These six species belong to the genus Trichosaundersia:
 Trichosaundersia callithrix Reinhard, 1975
 Trichosaundersia dorsopunctata (Macquart, 1843)
 Trichosaundersia lineata Townsend, 1914
 Trichosaundersia nora Curran, 1947
 Trichosaundersia rubripila (Rondani, 1850)
 Trichosaundersia rufopilosa (Wulp, 1888)

References

Further reading

 
 
 
 

Tachinidae
Articles created by Qbugbot